Killer Leopard is a 1954 American adventure film directed by Ford Beebe and starring Johnny Sheffield and Beverly Garland. It was the eleventh in the twelve-film Bomba, the Jungle Boy series made by Allied Artists.

Plot
Bomba is hunting a rogue leopard when Commissioner Barnes asks him to assist a movie starlet trying to find her lost husband. The husband, wanting nothing to do with his famous wife, isn't lost but is in Africa attempting to use money he embezzled to purchase illicit diamonds.

Cast
 Johnny Sheffield as Bomba
 Beverly Garland as Linda Winters
 Donald Murphy  as Fred Winters
 Barry Bernard as Charlie Pulham
 Leonard Mudie as Deputy Commissioner Andy Barnes
 Smoki Whitfield as Eli
 Russ Conway as Sgt. Maitland
 Rory Mallinson as Deevers
 Roy Glenn as Daniel

References

External links
 
 Killer Leopad at TCMDB
 
 

1954 films
American adventure films
Films directed by Ford Beebe
Monogram Pictures films
1950s English-language films
1954 adventure films
American black-and-white films
1950s American films